An Address, to the Hon. Edmund Burke. from the Swinish Multitude was a widely reviewed pamphlet by James Parkinson published in 1793 under his pseudonym "Old Hubert" in response and criticism to Edmund Burke's use of the phrase "swinish multitude" in his 1790 book Reflections on the Revolution in France.

E. P. Thompson quotes Parkinson's following passage from the pamphlet, in his The Making of the English Working Class:

References

External links 
 An Address, to the Hon. Edmund Burke from the Swinish Multitude on Google Books

Pamphlets
Edmund Burke
1793 non-fiction books